The Salawin Wildlife Sanctuary is located in Thailand near the border with Burma and includes the Thai section of the Salween River.

References

Protected areas established in 1978
Wildlife sanctuaries of Thailand
IUCN Category IV
1978 establishments in Thailand